Peace Commissioner is an honorary position in Ireland with special powers and whose role is primarily to make statutory declarations and witness signatures on documents required by various authorities. Peace Commissioners have the power to issue summons and warrants and sign certificates and orders under various Acts of the Oireachtas.

Role
The Courts of Justice Act 1924 gives Peace Commissioners the power to issue summons and warrants. The title, first proposed as "Parish Commissioner," replaced Justice of the Peace, which according to Dail Debates at the time of the Bill's discussion was considered 'Too British Sounding.'

Peace Commissioners are primarily used to issue summons and search warrants to the Gardaí (now less used as the constitutionality has been challenged), witness signatures on documents, take statutory declarations and sign certificates and orders. Peace commissioners cannot sign and authenticate Affidavits.

As of 2012, 5,733 Peace Commissioners were operating throughout the state.

A Peace Commissioner should not sign any document in which they have an "interest". The exact meaning of what constitutes an "interest" is vexing but generally means a PC should not sign documents for members of their own family or people with whom they work. The rationale behind the rule being that a Peace Commissioner should be an unbiased witness.

Appointment
The Office of Peace Commissioner is a discretionary appointment by the Minister for Justice, a member of the Government.

There is no special application form. An application for appointment may be made by an individual on their own behalf, or a nomination for appointment may be made by a third party. Nominations are generally received from public representatives, and a Garda superintendent may sometimes request an appointment in their district as the need arises in the public interest. Individuals seeking appointment to the Office of Peace Commissioner apply to the Minister for Justice with the reason for application or nomination and provide some background information about the individual proposed for appointment.

There is no qualifying examination, but appointees are required to be of good character and are usually well-established in the local community. People convicted of serious offences are considered unsuitable. Civil servants are generally only appointed where the performance of their official duties requires an appointment (i.e. ex-officio). Solicitors, people employed in legal offices, and members of the clergy are, as a matter of practice, not appointed because their occupation may cause a conflict of interest when exercising the duties of a peace commissioner. The fact that an applicant or nominee may be suitable for appointment does not, in itself, provide any entitlement to appointment as a peace commissioner because other factors, such as the need for appointments in particular areas, are considered.

Problems

The title of 'Peace Commissioner' is only recognized in Ireland, and it is not recommended to have a Peace Commissioner sign documents for use outside of Ireland. Most Peace Commissioners do not have a rubber stamp containing their name and title. This causes many documents to be rejected because forms and agencies expect a rubber stamp. A stamp is not required by the Minister for Justice, but in practice, agencies often reject stamp-less documents. When booking a Peace Commissioner, it is advisable to ask if they have a rubber stamp. Most Commissioners for Oaths do have a stamp.

Register

The Department of Justice maintains a roll of peace commissioners. However, this is not accessible online. The Department will usually provide the name and address of a peace commissioner on request. Local Garda stations, which use the services of a Peace Commissioner in their daily duties, are usually in a position to provide the name and address of a Peace Commissioner in a particular area.

Finding a notary public, a Commissioner for Oaths, or a solicitor is often easier. Solicitors and Commissioners for Oaths may witness statutory declarations and affidavits for a fee. Unlike Peace Commissioners, solicitors and Commissioners for Oaths are entitled to charge a fee for their work, giving them the incentive to advertise.

It is customary for Peace Commissioners to use the abbreviation PC after their name to make themselves known when requested by the Garda and members of the public to discharge their duties.

Costs and rates

Peace Commissioner is an honorary role, and there is no financial compensation by way of fees or expenses for their services. However, in practice many will ask for donations. Many have town centre premises and the act of signing a document does carry a cost, causing a debate in the legal community.

References

Law of the Republic of Ireland
Legal professions